John Patrick Comiskey is a Canadian Roman Catholic priest and author in the Diocese of London. Comiskey is Moderator of the Curia and Bishop's Delegate, and assistant professor of historical theology and a former Vice-Rector at St. Peter's Seminary. The job of the bishop's delegate is to reach settlements with victims of clergy abuse on behalf of the diocese.

Comiskey studied at St. Peter's Seminary before being ordained to the priesthood at St. Peter's Cathedral Basilica in London, Ontario by Bishop John Michael Sherlock.

Education
 HED, Historiae Ecclesiasticae (Doctor of Church History) Doctor, Pontifical Gregorian University, Rome
 HEL, Historiae Ecclesiasticae Licentiate, Pontifical Gregorian University, Rome
 M.Div., Master of Divinity, The University of Western Ontario
 BA, Bachelor of Arts, The University of Western Ontario

Publications

Books

Articles

References

University of Western Ontario alumni
St. Peter's Seminary (Diocese of London, Ontario) alumni
Pontifical Gregorian University alumni
Roman Catholic writers
Living people
21st-century Canadian Roman Catholic priests
Year of birth missing (living people)